Yeremino is a rural locality (a village) in Sizemskoye Rural Settlement, Sheksninsky District, Vologda Oblast, Russia. The population was 11 as of 2002.

Geography 
Yeremino is located 67 km northeast of Sheksna (the district's administrative centre) by road. Kuzminskoye is the nearest rural locality.

References 

Rural localities in Sheksninsky District